Boronia Province was an electorate of the Victorian Legislative Council. It was abolished progressively in 1992 and 1996 and was replaced with Koonung Province.

Members

Election results

References
 http://www.parliament.vic.gov.au/re-member/bioregsearch.cfm

Former electoral provinces of Victoria (Australia)